Saad Fadzil (born 8 December 1948) is a Malaysian former cyclist. He competed in the individual road race and team time trial events at the 1972 Summer Olympics.

References

External links
 

1948 births
Living people
Malaysian male cyclists
Olympic cyclists of Malaysia
Cyclists at the 1972 Summer Olympics
Place of birth missing (living people)